"Friends in Low Places" is a song by Garth Brooks.

Friends in Low Places may also refer to:

 Friends in Low Places (novel), a 1965 Alms for Oblivion novel by Simon Raven
 "Friends in Low Places" (I'm with Her), a 2004 television episode
 "Friends in Low Places" (Orange Is the New Black), a 2016 television episode
 "Friends in Low Places" (Wynonna Earp), a 2020 television episode

See also
 Friends in High Places (disambiguation)